The 2021 Virginia Cavaliers baseball team represented the University of Virginia during the 2021 NCAA Division I baseball season. The Cavaliers played their home games at Davenport Field as a member of the Atlantic Coast Conference. They were led by head coach Brian O'Connor, in his 18th season at Virginia.

Virginia qualified for the College World Series for the first time since the 2015 national championship season, where they finished 1–2.

Background

Roster

Game log

Columbia Regional

College World Series

Rankings

Notes

References

External links 
 Virginia Baseball Schedule

Virginia
Virginia Cavaliers baseball seasons
Virginia Cavaliers baseball
Virginia
College World Series seasons